Dzhokhar Dudayev Chechen Peacekeeping Battalion is a Chechen volunteer battalion named after the first President of the Chechen Republic of Ichkeria, Dzhokhar Dudayev. The battalion is made up mostly of Chechen volunteers, many of whom fought in the First Chechen War and Second Chechen War on the side of the Republic of Ichkeria. The battalion has been under the command of Adam Osmayev since 1 February 2015, after Isa Munayev was killed in action at the Battle of Debaltseve in Eastern Ukraine. The Dzhokhar Dudayev Battalion is one of several Chechen Armed Formations on the side of Ukraine.

Creation
The creation of the battalion began in early March 2014 in Denmark. This is where a large number of Chechens, opposed to Russia and forced to emigrate after the Second Russian-Chechen War, are located. It was initiated by the Free Caucasus Organization, which was created in 2006 in Denmark by political emigrants from Caucasus countries in Europe. On March 26, it was announced that the 1st company of the International Peacekeeping Battalion named after Dzhokhar Dudayev would be named after Sashko Biliy (Oleksandr Muzychko). The 2nd company is named after Khamzat Gelayev. The battalion's founder and first leader Isa Munayev was appointed a military commander in charge of the defense of the Chechen capital by Ichkeria's President Aslan Maskhadov during the Battle of Grozny (1999–2000) where he used various urban warfare tactics including ambushes, car bombs, and mines during the defense of the city.

Participation in warfare 

After the creation of the battalion in 2014, it has actively fought in the Donetsk region of Ukraine. It participated in the 2014 Battle of Ilovaisk. 
During the 2015 Battle of Debaltseve, the battalion led by its commander Isa Munayev took part in the intense fighting around the city. Fighters of the battalion led by Munayev organized raids behind the lines of the pro-Russian forces, attacking the command posts, artillery, rocket launchers and entrenched tanks. On February 1, Munayev was killed in action after being hit by shrapnel from a tank shell.

Chechen specialists take part in battles in Eastern Ukraine and work as instructors, training young commanders. 
 
After the 2022 Russian invasion of Ukraine, the battalion took part in the defense of Ukraine fighting in the Kyiv area against Russian forces. The Russian invasion of Ukraine saw the group receive a huge influx of new members. After the defence of Kyiv and the successful Kyiv counteroffensive against Russian troops, the battalion was deployed around the Kharkiv and Donetsk regions. Since then the battalion has fought in the Battle of Kharkiv and Battle of Izium, as well as participating in the Kharkiv offensive. Since November 2022, units have been deployed in Battle of Bakhmut, which has seen the scenes of intense fighting.

Notable members 
 , Chief of Staff of the Dzhokhar Dudayev Battalion. Colonel of the Azerbaijani Armed Forces, former Deputy Minister of Defense of Azerbaijan (1993–1995), former head of the Union of Officers of Azerbaijan. Wanted by his homeland.
 Sergey Melnikoff, a photographer with US citizenship. Holder of the Order of the Hero of Ichkeria.
 Nureddin Ismailov, he commanded the Boz Qurd (lit. "Grey Wolves") detachment during the Karabakh war
 Shamil Tsuneoka Tanaka, a Japanese journalist, converted to Islam in 2001 while being a member of Gelayev's detachment that took part in the conflict in the Kodori Gorge

See also 
 Ukrainian volunteer battalions (since 2014)
 Sheikh Mansur Battalion
 Separate Special Purpose Battalion
 Kadyrovites

References

2014 establishments in Ukraine
Regiments of the International Legion of Territorial Defense of Ukraine
Battalions of Ukraine
Military units and formations established in 2014
Military units and formations of Ukraine in the war in Donbas
Chechen armies in exile